The National Union of Insurance Workers (NUIW) was a trade union representing workers in the insurance industry in the United Kingdom.

The union was formed in 1964, when the National Amalgamated Union of Life Insurance Workers merged with the National Federation of Insurance Workers.  Initially, the union operated as a federation, with affiliates representing workers at larger individual companies, and a Composite Section for workers at smaller companies.  Several of these sections left in the 1970s to join the Association of Scientific, Technical and Managerial Staffs.  Three sections remained, representing workers at the Prudential, Liverpool Victoria and the Royal London, and these merged into the central union in 1984.

The union's membership fell over the years, from 25,740 in 1974, to only 12,519 in 1993.  In 2000, it merged into the Manufacturing, Science and Finance trade union.

Affiliates
 Britannic Field Staff Association
 Liverpool Victoria Workers' Union
 London and Manchester Field Staff Association
 National Pearl Federation
 National Union of Pearl Agents
 Prudential Staff Union
 Refuge Field Staff Association
 Royal Liver Employees' Union
 Royal London Staff Association

General Secretaries
1964: Terry Quinlan
1974: Fred Jarvis
1980: J. P. Brown
1988: R. Main
1993: Ken Perry

References

External links
Catalogue of the NUIW archives, held at the Modern Records Centre, University of Warwick
Catalogue of the Royal London Section archives, held at the Modern Records Centre, University of Warwick

Defunct trade unions of the United Kingdom
1964 establishments in the United Kingdom
Insurance industry trade unions
Trade unions established in 1964
Trade unions disestablished in 2000
Trade unions based in London